The Type XXVI was a German submarine project towards the end of the Second World War. Only five boats went into production, none of which were completed.

Concept 

After the use of electric propulsion in submarine construction in the course of the development of the Type XXI and XXIII submarines, the designs of Types XVII, XVIII and XXII by Walterwerke were not pursued any further. When it turned out that the XXI boats were unsuitable for the tactical requirements of the convoy raids, the Kiel family company saw the opportunity for a "Walter U-boat" again and on October 12, 1943 presented a concept with the designation XXVIA . On March 28 of the following year, the Commander-in-Chief of the Navy, Karl Dönitz, decided to have the boat built under the type designation XXVIW (for Walter). A week later, the naval war command formulated the requirements that the new type of boat had to meet, which was now given the designation XXVI. Then the Ingenieurbüro Glückauf (IBG) was entrusted with the final design and instructed to also prepare the construction of the boats. The IBG designed the production of the Type XXVI boats in the so-called Modular design. For this purpose, the construction of 8 raw sections of the respective boat should take place in a steel construction company and, based on this, the individual sections should then be manufactured at specialized submarine shipyards. Finally, these sections were to be delivered to a large shipyard and assembled there to form a submarine. It would have had a crew of three officers and 30 men. On May 26th, the construction contract for 100 boats of this type was given to the Schichau shipyard in Gdansk, which already had relevant experience with section building through the manufacture of the Type XXI boats.

Armament 
The armament consisted of ten torpedo tubes, four of them on the bow. During the development of the German submarines, which were to be equipped with a Walter drive, no torpedo tubes were planned at the stern, because the "Walter boats" had a sealed turbine room there, which complicated the operation of the rear torpedo tubes. For this reason, the Type XXVI was designed with six side torpedo tubes, which were located at the level of the command room, and were directed at an angle to the rear. Each torpedo tube on the boat was to be equipped with a torpedo. Reserve torpedoes were not provided, so that the time-consuming loading of the torpedo tubes during the journey was not necessary. About every 3-4 days, pulling the torpedoes out of the tubes by about 2.5 m for maintenance was only possible if some of the bunks in the crew compartment in the bow were folded up. There were no forms of anti-aircraft weapons on any of the submarines.

Construction 
The Hauptausschuß Schiffbau presented a production plan in early May 1944 that a total of 66 boats were planned to be completed for the year 1945, with volume production to begin in May 1945 After a revision of the production times planned by the IBG – eight weeks for the raw sections, six weeks for the construction of each section and seven weeks for the assembly – the number to be produced was increased to 74 boats for 1945. The order for the production of 100 boats – U 4501 to U 4600 – was first placed on May 26, 1944 at the Schichau shipyard in Danzig, who already had relevant experience with the construction of sections through the production of the Type XXI boats. The amount of crude steel required for the hundred boats was estimated at 46,240 t. On August 27 of the same year, the order was accepted by the Blohm + Voss shipyard. The Hamburg shipyard specialized in the assembly of Walter systems as well as in the assembly of sections. By the end of the war, some sections for U 4501 to U 4504 were under construction. The other contracts were no longer implemented.

See also 
 List of U-boat types
 List of submarine classes
 Uncompleted U-boat projects

References

Bibliography

U-boats